Roy Campanella (November 19, 1921 – June 26, 1993), nicknamed "Campy", was an American baseball player, primarily as a catcher. The Philadelphia native played in the Negro leagues and Mexican League for nine years before entering the minor leagues in 1946. He made his Major League Baseball (MLB) debut in 1948 for the Brooklyn Dodgers, for whom he played until 1957. His playing career ended when he was paralyzed in an automobile accident in January 1958. He is considered one of the greatest catchers in the history of the game.

After he retired as a player as a result of the accident, Campanella held positions in scouting and community relations with the Dodgers. He was inducted into the Baseball Hall of Fame in 1969.

Early life and education
Roy Campanella was born in Philadelphia to parents Ida, who was African American, and John Campanella, son of Italian immigrants. Roy was one of four children born to the couple. They first lived in Germantown, and then moved to Nicetown in North Philadelphia, where the children attended integrated schools. Because of their mixed-race, he and his siblings were sometimes harassed by other children in school. Campanella had athletic gifts that he used to great effect. He was elected captain of every sports team he played on in high school, but baseball was his passion.

Playing career

Negro leagues
Of mixed race, Campanella was prohibited from MLB play as a result of the baseball color line. In 1937, at the age of 15, he began playing Negro league baseball for the Washington Elite Giants on weekends, subsequently dropping out of high school a few months later on his 16th birthday so he could play full time.  The Elite Giants moved to Baltimore the following year, and Campanella became a star player with the team until 1945.

Mexican and Venezuelan leagues
During the 1942 season, Campanella left the Baltimore Elite Giants after a spat with owner Tom Wilson. He played the rest of the season and the following 1943 season in the Mexican League with the Monterrey Sultans. Lázaro Salazar, the team's manager, told Campanella that one day he would play at the major league level. Campanella subsequently returned to the Elite Giants for the 1944–45 seasons.

In 1946, Campanella played in the newly formed Venezuelan Professional Baseball League on the Sabios de Vargas team, which he was co-coach and led to the league championship.

Minor leagues
His easy-going personality and strong work ethic were credited with his being able to move successfully between the races. Although Branch Rickey considered hiring Campanella to break baseball's color barrier, Rickey ultimately decided upon Robinson.

For the 1946 season, Robinson was assigned to the Montreal Royals, the Dodgers' affiliate in the Class AAA International League.  On March 18, 1946, Campanella signed a contract to play for Danville Dodgers of the Illinois–Indiana–Iowa League. After the general manager of the Danville Dodgers reported that he did not feel the league was ready for racial integration, the organization sent Campanella and pitcher Don Newcombe to the Nashua Dodgers of the Class B New England League, where the Dodgers felt the climate would be more tolerant. The Nashua team thus became the first professional baseball team of the 20th century to field a racially integrated lineup in the United States.

Campanella's 1946 season proceeded largely without racist incidents, and in one game Campanella assumed the managerial duties after manager Walter Alston was ejected. Campanella was the first African American to manage White players of an organized professional baseball team. Nashua was three runs down at the time Campanella took over. They came back to win, in part due to Campanella's decision to use Newcombe as a pinch hitter during the seventh inning; Newcombe hit a game-tying two-run home run.

Major League Baseball

Jackie Robinson's first season in the major leagues came in 1947, and Campanella began his MLB career with the Brooklyn Dodgers the following season, playing his first game on April 20, 1948.  In later years, Robinson and his wife sometimes stayed with the Campanella family during some ballgames because adequate hotels for blacks could not be found in the city.

Campanella played for the Dodgers from  through  as their regular catcher. In 1948, he had three different uniform numbers (33, 39, and 56) before settling on 39 for the rest of his career.

Campanella was selected to the All-Star Game every year from  through . With his 1949 All-Star selection, he was one of the first four African Americans so honored. (Jackie Robinson, Don Newcombe and Larry Doby were also All-Stars in 1949.)  In 1950 Campanella hit home runs in five straight games; the only other Dodgers to homer in five consecutive games are Shawn Green (2001), Matt Kemp (2010), Adrián González (2014–15), and Joc Pederson (2015).

In each of his MVP seasons, he batted more than .300, hit more than 30 home runs, and had more than 100 runs batted in. His 142 RBI during 1953 exceeded the franchise record of 130, which had been held by Jack Fournier and Babe Herman. That same year, Campanella hit 40 home runs in games in which he appeared as a catcher, a record that lasted until , when it was exceeded by Todd Hundley. During his career, he threw out 57% of the base runners who tried to steal a base on him, the highest by any catcher in major league history. Campanella had five of the seven top caught stealing percentages for a single season in major league history.

In 1955 (Campanella's final MVP season), he helped Brooklyn win its first World Series championship. After the Dodgers lost the first two games of the series to the Yankees, Campanella began Brooklyn's comeback by hitting a two-out, two-run home run in the first inning of Game 3. The Dodgers won that game, got another home run from Campanella in a Game 4 victory that tied the series, and then went on to claim the series in seven games when Johnny Podres shutout the Yankees 2–0 in Game 7.

Campanella caught three no-hitters during his career: Carl Erskine's two on June 19,  and May 12,  and Sal Maglie's on September 25, 1956. "In my no-hitter...I only shook Campy off once," Maglie recalled. "He was doing the thinking, calling the pitches just right for every batter in every situation, and all I had to do was check the sign to see if I agreed and then throw."

After the 1957 season, the Brooklyn Dodgers relocated to Los Angeles and became the Los Angeles Dodgers, but Campanella's playing career came to an end as a result of an automobile accident. He never played a game for Los Angeles.

Automobile accident

Campanella lived in Glen Cove, New York, on the North Shore of Long Island; he operated a liquor store in Harlem between regular-season games and during the off-season. After closing the store for the night on January 28, 1958, he began his drive home to Glen Cove. He fractured the fifth and sixth cervical vertebrae and compressed the spinal cord. The accident left Campanella paralyzed from the shoulders down. With physical therapy, he was eventually able to regain substantial use of his arms and hands. He was able to feed himself, shake hands, and gesture while speaking, but he required a wheelchair for mobility for the remainder of his life.

Post-playing career

After his playing career, Campanella remained involved with the Dodgers. In January 1959, the Dodgers named him assistant supervisor of scouting for the eastern United States and special coach at the team's annual spring training camp in Vero Beach, Florida, serving each year as a mentor and coach to young catchers in the Dodger organization.

On May 7, the Dodgers, then playing their second season in Los Angeles, honored him with Roy Campanella Night at the Los Angeles Memorial Coliseum. The New York Yankees agreed to make a special visit to Los Angeles (between road series in Kansas City and Chicago) to play an exhibition game against the Dodgers for the occasion. The Yankees won the Thursday night game 6–2, with an attendance of 93,103, setting a record at that time for the largest crowd to attend a Major League Baseball game. The proceeds from the game went to defray Campanella's medical bills.

In July , Campanella was inducted into the Baseball Hall of Fame in Cooperstown, the second player of black heritage so honored, after Jackie Robinson. The same year, he received the Bronze Medallion from the City of New York.

Campanella was elected to the Mexican Professional Baseball Hall Of Fame in 1971. On June 4, 1972, the Dodgers retired Campanella's uniform number 39 alongside Jackie Robinson's number 42 and Sandy Koufax's number 32.

In 1978, Campanella moved to California and accepted a job with the Dodgers as assistant to the director of community relations, Don Newcombe, his former teammate and longtime friend.

Representation in other media

Campanella was interviewed by Edward R. Murrow on the CBS program Person to Person on October 2, 1953, and again on January 2, 1959. He appeared as Mystery Guest on What's My Line? episode 171 on September 6, 1953, and as a guest celebrity on The Name's the Same (ABC-TV) on July 27, 1954. He also appeared as himself in the Lassie episode "The Mascot", first broadcast September 27, 1959, in a story where he is coaching Timmy Martin's "Boys' League" team. Campanella was also honored on the Ralph Edwards show This Is Your Life.

Campanella is mentioned in the lyrics of multiple songs, including "Did You See Jackie Robinson Hit that Ball?", written and recorded by Buddy Johnson in 1949 (and covered by Count Basie and his Orchestra that same year), "We Didn't Start the Fire" by Billy Joel, and he in the refrain of "Talkin' Baseball" by Terry Cashman.

Marriages and family
Campanella was married three times.  His first marriage, to Bernice Ray on January 3, 1939, ended in divorce. They had two daughters together.

On April 30, 1945, he married Ruthe Willis, who brought her son David to the marriage. They had three children together (including a son, Roy Campanella II, who became a television director).  Their marriage deteriorated after Campanella's accident; they separated in 1960. Ruthe died of a heart attack at age 40 in January 1963.

On May 5, 1964, Campanella married Roxie Doles, who survived him.

Death
Campanella died of heart failure at age 71 on June 26, 1993, at his home in Woodland Hills, California. His body was cremated at the Forest Lawn, Hollywood Hills Cemetery in Los Angeles.

Legacy

In 1999, Campanella ranked number 50 on The Sporting News''' list of the 100 Greatest Baseball Players, and was a nominee for the Major League Baseball All-Century Team.

The book Carl Erskine's Tales from the Dodgers Dugout: Extra Innings (2004) includes short stories from former Dodger pitcher Carl Erskine. He features Campanella in many of these stories.

Campanella wrote his autobiography, It's Good to Be Alive, which was published in 1959; he discussed his convalescence and partial recovery after his accident. Michael Landon directed a TV-movie based on the book, It's Good to Be Alive (1974), which was considerably fictionalized. Campanella was portrayed by Paul Winfield.

Campanella was featured on a United States postage stamp in 2006. The stamp is one of a block of four honoring baseball sluggers, the others being Mickey Mantle, Hank Greenberg, and Mel Ott.

In September 2006, the Los Angeles Dodgers announced the creation of the Roy Campanella Award. The club's players and coaches vote on it annually, and is given to the Dodger who best exemplifies "Campy's" spirit and leadership. Shortstop Rafael Furcal was named the inaugural winner of the award.

Simon & Schuster published a 2011 biography of Campanella written by Neil Lanctot, author of Negro League Baseball – The Rise and Ruin of a Black Institution.  The book is titled Campy – The Two Lives of Roy Campanella.  The book reveals new details about Campanella's near-fatal car accident and his volatile relationship with Jackie Robinson.  It also provides the most comprehensive look at Campanella's Negro league career, including newly compiled year-by-year statistics.

SpiritClips.com, a sub-division of Hallmark Channel, released "Roy Campanella Night", a 2013 short film documenting the period of paralysis and convalescence that preceded Roy Campanella receiving a public tribute on May 7, 1959, at Los Angeles Memorial Coliseum. The movie was directed by Chris Commons and stars Anthony Holiday, Tia Streaty and Nathan Wilson.

See also

 List of Major League Baseball career home run leaders
 List of Major League Baseball annual runs batted in leaders
 List of Major League Baseball players who spent their entire career with one franchise
 List of members of the Mexican Professional Baseball Hall of Fame
 List of Negro league baseball players who played in Major League Baseball

Footnotes

References
 Campanella, Roy. It's Good to Be Alive, New York: Little Brown and Co., 1959
 Daly, Steve. Dem Little Bums:  The Nashua Dodgers, Concord, New Hampshire:  Plaidswede Publishing, 2002
 Kashatus, William C. Jackie & Campy: The Untold Story of Their Rocky Relationship and the Breaking of Baseball's Color Line, Lincoln: University of Nebraska Press, 2014. Finalist, 2014 CASEY Award. 
 Lanctot, Neil. Campy - The Two Lives of Roy Campanella, New York: Simon & Schuster, 2011. 
 Roper, Scott C., and Stephanie Abbot Roper. We're Going to Give All We Have for this Grand Little Town': Baseball Integration and the 1946 Nashua Dodgers".  Historical New Hampshire, Spring/Summer, 1998
 Tygiel, Jules. Baseball's Great Experiment: Jackie Robinson and His Legacy, New York: Oxford University Press, 1997
 Young, A. S. (Andrew Sturgeon). Great Negro Baseball Stars, and How They Made the Major Leagues'', New York: A. S. Barnes, 1953.

External links

 and Seamheads
 Roy Campanella addressing The New York Herald Tribune Book and Author Luncheon October 26, 1959 as broadcast by WNYC Radio.

1921 births
1993 deaths
African-American baseball players
American people of Italian descent
American expatriate baseball players in Canada
American expatriate baseball players in Mexico
American people with disabilities
American sportsmen
Baseball players from Philadelphia
Baltimore Elite Giants players
Brooklyn Dodgers players
Burials at Forest Lawn Memorial Park (Hollywood Hills)
Cangrejeros de Santurce (baseball) players
Liga de Béisbol Profesional Roberto Clemente catchers
Los Angeles Dodgers scouts
Major League Baseball catchers
Major League Baseball players with retired numbers
Mexican Baseball Hall of Fame inductees
Montreal Royals players
Nashua Dodgers players
National League All-Stars
National League Most Valuable Player Award winners
National Baseball Hall of Fame inductees
National League RBI champions
People with tetraplegia
Sabios de Vargas players
St. Paul Saints (AA) players
Sportspeople from Brooklyn
Baseball players from New York City
Baseball players from Los Angeles
Sultanes de Monterrey players
20th-century African-American sportspeople
African-American history of Westchester County, New York